Anthony Walsh is a former racing cyclist from New Zealand.

He won the silver medal in the men's road race at the 1962 British Empire and Commonwealth Games.

Anthony (Tony) Walsh was awarded life membership to the Moturoa Association Football Club of New Plymouth in 1992.

References

New Zealand male cyclists
Commonwealth Games silver medallists for New Zealand
Cyclists at the 1962 British Empire and Commonwealth Games
Living people
Place of birth missing (living people)
Commonwealth Games medallists in cycling
Year of birth missing (living people)
20th-century New Zealand people
Medallists at the 1962 British Empire and Commonwealth Games